Acyclania is a genus of moths in the family Noctuidae first described by Paul Dognin in 1911. It was historically misclassified on multiple occasions, but in 2010 was determined to belong to the subfamily Agaristinae.

Species
Acyclania schadei Schaus, 1927 Paraguay
Acyclania tenebrosa Dognin, 1911 Argentina, Brazil (Minas Gerais)

References

Agaristinae